The 2022 Mito HollyHock season is the 25th straight season since being introduced in 1998 to a national-level league, the Japan Football League. It is also the 23rd consecutive season that Mito HollyHock has played in the J2 League.

Squad 
As of 26 August 2022. '

DSP

Type 2

Type 2

Out on loan

League table

J2 League 
The following shows all the matches they played in this year's J2 edition. 
Mito HollyHock results for 2022:  (Japanese)

Emperor's Cup 
As they were in 2022 a J2 League team, they were qualified to the Emperor's Cup automatically, and directly placed into the second round, with no need of going through qualification rounds. They faced another J2 League team in their first match and lost on extra-time.

References

External links 
 J.League official site

Mito HollyHock
Mito HollyHock seasons